Broken Lives (Spanish:Vidas rotas) is a 1935 Spanish drama film directed by Eusebio Fernández Ardavín and starring Lupita Tovar, Maruchi Fresno and Enrique Zabala. Contracts with the crew were signed in Barcelona and Madrid in August and September 1934. Filming commenced in October of the same year at CEA Studios in Madrid. The film was produced by INCA Films, it was the company's first sound movie.  The premier took place on 20 April 1935 in Cine Avenida. It was released in the United States in 1935.

Cast
 Lupita Tovar as Marcela  
 Maruchi Fresno as Irene 
 Enrique Zabala as Andrés Borja 
 María Amaya as Carmen  
 Manuel Arbó as Músico  
 Fernando Fernández de Córdoba as Juan Gras  
 Arturo Girelli as Carlitos  
 José Isbert as Paco  
 Cándida Losada as Catalina 
 Manuel París as Alvear  
 Luisa Sala 
 María Anaya
 Dolores Valero as Campesina 
 Paco Álvarez as Fernandito

References

External links

1935 films
Spanish drama films
Spanish black-and-white films
1935 drama films
1930s Spanish-language films
Films directed by Eusebio Fernández Ardavín